Dysodia is a genus of moths of the family Thyrididae. It was described by James Brackenridge Clemens in 1860.

Description
Forewings long. Hindwings with apex acute, the outer margin straight. Palpi thickly scaled, upturned, reaching above vertex of head, the third joint acute. Antennae simple in both sexes. Legs are with hairy femur and tibia. Forewings excurved at veins 2, 3 and 4. Veins 7, 8 and 9 from close to the angle of cell. Hindwings with vein 5 from lower angle of cell. The outer margin is irregular and excised below the apex. Thorax and abdomen is stout.

Species
Some species of this genus are:
Dysodia amania Whalley, 1968
Dysodia antennata Whalley, 1968
Dysodia binoculata Warren, 1901
Dysodia brandbergensis Thiele, 2004
Dysodia collinsi Whalley, 1968
Dysodia constellata Warren, 1908
Dysodia fenestratella Warren, 1900
Dysodia flavidula Warren, 1908
Dysodia fumida Whalley, 1968
Dysodia hamata Whalley, 1968
Dysodia ignita (Walker, 1865)
Dysodia incognita Whalley, 1968
Dysodia intermedia (Walker, 1865)
Dysodia lutescens Whalley, 1968
Dysodia magnifica Whalley, 1968
Dysodia meyi Thiele, 2004
Dysodia namibiensis Thiele, 2004
Dysodia parvita Whalley, 1971
Dysodia subsignata Warren, 1908
Dysodia vitrina (Boisduval, 1829)
Dysodia zellerii (Dewitz, 1881)

References

Thyrididae
Moth genera